Janis Tanaka (born January 9, 1963) is an American bassist who has worked as a session musician and on tour with a number of well-known artists including Pink, Fireball Ministry, Hammers of Misfortune, Stone Fox, and L7. She was also a member of the Pagan Babies, a band started by Courtney Love, Kat Bjelland, and Deirdre Schletter in the 1980s.

Career 
Tanaka grew up in Long Beach, California, in a family with several sisters. She took courses at UCLA for one year followed by Long Beach City College. Tanaka began playing guitar, violin, and piano in elementary school.

Music 
Early bands Tanaka played with include The Jackson Saints and Sugar Baby Doll.

She left Hammers of Misfortune to play with Pink. In 2001, Tanaka appeared on The Tonight Show with Jay Leno supporting Pink.

She has also played in the band Winterthrall. As of 2017, Tanaka was reportedly playing in The Big Meat Combo and in the all female version of Los Angeles-based Femme Fatale.

Film 
Tanaka has appeared in several films as herself including L7: Pretend We're Dead, released in 2016 and directed by Sarah Price, and Fireball Ministry: Master of None, released in 2003. She has acted in the films: Live Freaky Die Freaky, Down and Out With Dolls and starred in the film The Year of My Japanese Cousin (1995). She had a starring role in The Year of My Japanese Cousin and received a favorable review of her performance in the San Francisco Chronicle.

References

External links 

Living people
American rock bass guitarists
Women bass guitarists
American women singers
American women heavy metal singers
American singers of Asian descent
American musicians of Japanese descent
American women musicians of Japanese descent
L7 (band) members
Singers from San Francisco
American film actresses
Actresses from San Francisco
1963 births
Guitarists from San Francisco
20th-century American bass guitarists
20th-century American women musicians
Feminist musicians